Yaxley is a village and civil parish in the Huntingdonshire district in Cambridgeshire, England. The village is located near the Hampton township, and is approximately three miles north-east of junction 16 of the A1(M) at Norman Cross.

History 
Yaxley was listed as Lacheslei in the Domesday Book of 1086 in the Hundred of Norman Cross in Huntingdonshire. In 1086 there was one manor at Yaxley and 39 households.

The Church of England Parish Church of St Peter is a Grade I listed building.

Government 

As a civil parish, Yaxley has a parish council. The parish council is elected by the residents of the parish who have registered on the electoral roll; the parish council is the lowest tier of government in England. A parish council is responsible for providing and maintaining a variety of local services including allotments and a cemetery; grass cutting and tree planting within public open spaces such as a village green or playing fields. The parish council reviews all planning applications that might affect the parish and makes recommendations to Huntingdonshire District Council, which is the local planning authority for the parish. The parish council also represents the views of the parish on issues such as local transport, policing and the environment. The parish council raises its own tax to pay for these services, known as the parish precept, which is collected as part of the Council Tax.

Yaxley was in the historic and administrative county of Huntingdonshire until 1965. From 1965, the village was part of the new administrative county of Huntingdon and Peterborough. Then in 1974, following the Local Government Act 1972, Yaxley became a part of the county of Cambridgeshire.

The second tier of local government is Huntingdonshire District Council which is a non-metropolitan district of Cambridgeshire and has its headquarters in Huntingdon. Huntingdonshire District Council has 52 councillors representing 29 district wards. Huntingdonshire District Council collects the council tax, and provides services such as building regulations, local planning, environmental health, leisure and tourism. Yaxley is a part of the district ward of Yaxley and Farcet and is represented on the district council by three councillors. District councillors serve for four-year terms following elections to Huntingdonshire District Council.

For Yaxley the highest tier of local government is Cambridgeshire County Council which has administration buildings in Cambridge. The county council provides county-wide services such as major road infrastructure, fire and rescue, education, social services, libraries and heritage services. Cambridgeshire County Council consists of 69 councillors representing 60 electoral divisions. Yaxley is part of the electoral division of Norman Cross and is represented on the county council by two councillors.

At Westminster Yaxley is in the parliamentary constituency of North West Cambridgeshire, and elects one Member of Parliament (MP) by the first past the post system of election. Yaxley is represented in the House of Commons by Shailesh Vara (Conservative). Shailesh Vara has represented the constituency since 2005. The previous member of parliament was Brian Mawhinney (Conservative) who represented the constituency between 1997 and 2005.

Demography

Population
In the period 1801 to 1901 the population of Yaxley was recorded every 10 years by the UK census.  During this time the population was in the range of 986 (the lowest was in 1801) and 1,590 (the highest was in 1901).

From 1901, a census was taken every ten years with the exception of 1941 (due to the Second World War). The population at the Census 2011 included Denton.

All population census figures from report Historic Census figures Cambridgeshire to 2011 by Cambridgeshire Insight.

Sport and leisure

Yaxley has a Non-League football club Yaxley F.C., which play at Leading Drove. Yaxley also has a number of Rugby League players who play with Cambridge Lions in Cambridge. Denmark's Speedway World Cup winning captain Niels Kristian Iversen is the village's most famous sporting resident.

The Yaxley to Farcet cycleway was replaced after two boys were killed on the route.

Notable People
Olinthus Gregory, a mathematician who was born in Yaxley.
Peter Burroughs, resided in Yaxley, running a shop and later in life becoming an actor.

See Also
Yaxley F.C.

References

External links

Places to eat in Yaxley
Yaxley History Website
Yaxley Festival
Parish council website
Cambridge Lions

 
Villages in Cambridgeshire
Civil parishes in Cambridgeshire
Huntingdonshire